Remontnoye is a rural locality (a selo) and the administrative center of Remontnensky District, Rostov Oblast, Russia. Population:

Climate

References

Notes

Sources

Rural localities in Rostov Oblast